Mohamed  Salmi (born 1963) is a retired Algerian long-distance runner who specialized in the marathon.

He finished 59th in the 1992 Olympic marathon. He also competed at the 1991 World Championships and the 1993 World Championships but failed to finish the race on both occasions. He also won the silver medal in the 10,000 metres at the 1990 Maghreb Championships, behind Khalid Boulami.

His personal best time was 2.12.47 hours, achieved in the 1993 Eindhoven Marathon, a competition he won.

Achievements
All results regarding marathon, unless stated otherwise

References

1963 births
Living people
Algerian male long-distance runners
Athletes (track and field) at the 1992 Summer Olympics
Olympic athletes of Algeria
21st-century Algerian people
20th-century Algerian people